Sternal clefts are rare congenital malformations that result from defective embryologic fusion of paired mesodermal bands in the ventral midline. They may be associated with other midline defects (as in pentalogy of Cantrell). It may also occur in isolation. Sternal cleft is treated by surgery in early life to avoid fixation leading to immobility.

See also 
 PHACE association
 List of cutaneous conditions

References

External links 

Musculoskeletal disorders